Ṭe is a letter of the extended Arabic alphabet, derived from te by replacing the dots with a small t̤oʾe (historically four dots in a square pattern). It is not used in the Arabic alphabet itself, but is used to represent an voiceless retroflex plosive [ʈ] in Urdu, Punjabi written in the Shahmukhi script, and Kashmiri as well as Balochi. The small t̤oʾe diacritic is used to indicate a retroflex consonant in Urdu. It is the fifth letter of the Urdu alphabet. Its Abjad value is considered to be 400. In Urdu, this letter may also be called tā-ye-musaqqalā ("heavy te") or tā-ye-hindiyā ("Indian te"). In Devanagari, this consonant is rendered using ‘ट’.

Character encoding

Some layout engines do not properly generate the medial and initial forms (which should look like  and ) and will render the isolate form , without joining.

References

Arabic letters